Suppose that  and  are two monoidal categories. A monoidal adjunction between two lax monoidal functors
 and 
is an adjunction  between the underlying functors, such that the natural transformations
 and 
are monoidal natural transformations.

Lifting adjunctions to monoidal adjunctions 
Suppose that

is a lax monoidal functor such that the underlying functor  has a right adjoint . This adjunction lifts to a monoidal adjunction ⊣ if and only if the lax monoidal functor  is strong.

See also 
 Every monoidal adjunction ⊣ defines a monoidal monad .

Adjoint functors
Monoidal categories